Obama: In Pursuit of a More Perfect Union is a 2021 documentary series about Barack Obama, the 44th President of the United States. It was directed by Peter Kunhardt and is named after Obama's March 18, 2008 speech, which he delivered during his 2008 campaign.

It was released in August 2021 to coincide with Obama's 60th birthday.

Reception
The series has received positive reviews. It has a 91% rating on Rotten Tomatoes.

References

External links
 Obama: In Pursuit of a More Perfect Union at HBO
 Obama: In Pursuit of a More Perfect Union at IMDb

2021 American television series debuts
2021 American television series endings
2020s American documentary television series
American documentary television series about politics
Films directed by Peter Kunhardt
Films about Barack Obama
HBO documentary films
HBO Max films